Iaquinta is an Italian surname. Notable people with the surname include:

 Al Iaquinta (born 1987), American mixed martial artist
 Vincenzo Iaquinta (born 1979), Italian footballer

Italian-language surnames